Chaos Control is a rail shooter developed by Infogrames Multimedia and published by Philips Interactive Media for the CD-i, MS-DOS, Macintosh, Sega Saturn and PlayStation in 1995. The game's cutscenes are rendered in a style reminiscent of anime.

An enhanced remake titled Chaos Control Remix was released by Virgin Interactive Entertainment exclusively for the Sega Saturn in 1996. It was released in PAL regions under the name Chaos Control, causing it to sometimes be confused with the original game.

Gameplay
Chaos Control is a sci-fi themed rail shooter which puts the player inside the cockpit of a fighter ship. Although the spaceship flight is automated, the player may target freely using an on-screen reticule, timing their shots so that the fighter's guns do not overheat. Targets across the game's four levels include mech suits, other spaceships and virtual reality constructs, most of which will return fire in an effort to drain the player's shields. There are no bonuses or re-charge power-ups for these shields, and play must restart from the beginning of the level if the player's ship is destroyed.

Enemy positions are predetermined and unchanging. This - in combination with fixed flight paths - means that the player can seek to learn the game's deployment pattern for each level, defeating them through memorization.

Chaos Control Remix supports the Saturn's Virtua Gun. The CD-i version requires the CD-i's Digital Video Cartridge to play.

Plot

Chaos Control'''s protagonist is a pilot named Jessica Darkhill, whose partner was killed earlier in the war against the game's antagonists, the alien Kesh Rhan. Beginning in Manhattan, Darkhill must break through the Kesh Rhan defenses, destroy a computer virus of their making, then mount an attack upon the alien mothership in order to save Earth from the alien invasion.

Reception
Reviewing the CD-i version, GamePro commented that "Chaos Control is a looker, a fun way to waste some time. As far as depth and challenge, though, it doesn't deliver the chaos that it should." They criticized the lack of multiple weapons and rail shooter gameplay as too limited, but praised the heavily detailed backgrounds and the high level of onscreen action. Next Generation admired the "spectacular visual results" of the full motion video and stylish animations, but advised that the game would bore anyone who does not enjoy the "straightforward and mindless" gameplay of full motion video-based rail shooters. They scored the game two out of five stars. GamePro later awarded it Best CD-i Game of 1995.

Rob Allsetter gave Chaos Control Remix 56% in Sega Saturn Magazine. Like reviews for the CD-i version, he was pleased with the graphics, citing the polished rendering and sense of depth, but found the gameplay monotonous, since the unrelenting pace prompts the player to simply fire indiscriminately at the screen. He also judged the longevity to be exceptionally low, since the game can be finished in roughly half an hour and the absence of scoring features such as an accuracy ratio leaves it with no replay value.Computer Game Review was sharply critical of Chaos Controls computer version, dubbing it a substandard copy of Star Wars: Rebel Assault. In 1996, Computer Gaming World declared Chaos Control'' the 38th-worst computer game ever released.

References

External links
 

1995 video games
CD-i games
Full motion video based games
Rail shooters
Science fiction video games
Video games developed in France
Video games featuring female protagonists
Video games set in New York City
DOS games
Piko Interactive games
PlayStation (console) games
Sega Saturn games
Classic Mac OS games
Single-player video games
Infogrames games
Virgin Interactive games